Kawa is a 2010 New Zealand film directed by Katie Wolfe originally titled Nights in the Gardens of Spain. The film stars Calvin Tuteao as Kawariki. A coming out film drama, it is based on the novel Nights in the Gardens of Spain by Witi Ihimaera.

Plot
The film tells the story of Kawariki (Calvin Tuteao), an apparently happy family man married to Annabelle (Nathalie Boltt). His father, Hamiora (George Henare), is retiring and according to Maori tradition, Kawariki should be prepared to take over his father's place as head of the family. However, he realizes that to do so, he must keep his integrity and reveal his lifelong secret of being gay ever since childhood. He has been desperately fighting his feelings for years, but he now frequents gay baths and he has a love affair with Chris (Dean O'Gorman).

Things get more complicated and acquire more urgency when his mother, Grace (Vicky Haughton), discovers him kissing Chris on the beach after a fight between the two and decides to expel him from her house. When he finally comes out to his father and his wife, it is too late for Chris, who has moved in with another partner after waiting for so long for him.

Kawa has to quit home but is torn with his love for his son, Sebastian (Pana Hema Taylor), and his daughter, Miranda (Miriama-Jane Devantier). Meanwhile, his daughter's absolute attachment to him is the catalyst for the family coming back together.

The film ends with a scene in which Kawa's father is reconciled with himself and visits his son at his new residence to deliver him the traditional Maori emblem.

Accolades
During the 2011 New Zealand Film and TV Awards, Dean O'Gorman was nominated for the award for "Best Performance by a Supporting Actor" for his role as Chris in the film.

Cast
Calvin Tuteao as Kawariki
Nathalie Boltt as Annabelle
George Henare as Hamiora
Vicky Haughton as Grace
Dean O'Gorman as Chris
Pana Hema Taylor as Sebastian
Miriama-Jane Devantier as Miranda
Geoffrey Snell as Walter
Jarod Rawiri as Wayne
Jack Walley as Coach
Bridget Pyc as Emily

References

External links
 

2010 films
2010s New Zealand films
New Zealand LGBT-related films
Films based on New Zealand novels
Māori-language films
New Zealand drama films
Films about Māori people
LGBT-related drama films
2010 drama films
2010 LGBT-related films